Al Subeaei Tower Complex is a skyscraper located in Khobar, Saudi Arabia.

Overview
The construction of Al Subeaei Tower Complex began in 2002 and was completed in 2004. The total cost of the project was $22,400,000.

It is located on King Abdul Aziz Road in the growing business district of Tahila in Khobar. It is the fourth tallest skyscraper in Khobar. It is about 62 m in height, and contains 18 floors. The complex is mainly used for commercial offices.

References

External links
 Panoramio
 Panoramio

2004 establishments in Saudi Arabia
Buildings and structures completed in 2004
Skyscraper office buildings in Saudi Arabia